Jangan Pandang Belakang Congkak is a 2009 Malaysian Malay-language horror comedy film directed by Ahmad Idham. It was produced after the success of Idham's previous horror movies - Jangan Pandang Belakang and Congkak.

Synopsis
The film tells a story of three youths from Kuala Lumpur: Punai (Mazlan Pet Pet), a car jockey; Asmat (Cat Farish), a cleaner and 'rapper wannabe'; and Johan (Sam Shaheizy), an 'acting star wannabe'.

They each received a letter from the late Pak Sudir (Piee), inviting them to his house. Upon their arrival, they meet up with Pak Sudir's assistant, Mustika (Lisa Surihani), and they discover that Pak Sudir was actually their grandfather who happens to be very rich.

The three of them stand a chance to inherit all of his belongings and wealth but under strict circumstances; they would have to stay at his house for three days consecutively without touching anything, especially an old congkak. On the first night itself, strange occurrences begin to happen.

Cast
 Shaheizy Sam as Johan
 Cat Farish as Asmat
 Lan Pet Pet as Punai
 Lisa Surihani as Mustika
 Azlee Jaafar as Pak Mor
 Piee as Pak Sudir
 Den Wahab as Latiff
 Belalang as Megat
 Dina as Ziana
 Zarina Zainoordin as Wati
 Mas Muharni as Wawa

References

External links
 

2009 comedy horror films
2009 films
Malaysian comedy horror films
Metrowealth Pictures films
Films directed by Ahmad Idham
Films produced by David Teo
2009 comedy films
Malay-language films